"Levitating" is a song by English-Albanian singer Dua Lipa from her second studio album, Future Nostalgia (2020). The song was written by Lipa, Clarence Coffee Jr., Sarah Hudson, and Koz, who produced the song with Stuart Price, and stemmed from a Roland VP-330 synthesizer sample played by Koz. The song is an electro-disco and nu-disco song with several disco tropes. It incorporates elements of dance-pop, pop-funk, power pop and space rock, as well as 1970s, 1980s and 1990s pop and R&B styles. The lyrics describe the idea of "levitating" when falling in love, with several outer space references.

A remix of "Levitating" by American DJ the Blessed Madonna featuring Madonna and Missy Elliott was released for digital download and streaming on 13 August 2020 as the lead single from Lipa and the Blessed Madonna's remix album Club Future Nostalgia (2020). It was categorised as an EDM, electro-disco, electro house, future bass, and techno track, with a throwback disco and trance vibe, and an increased tempo from the original. A second remix featuring American rapper DaBaby was released for the same formats on 1 October 2020 in promotion of the bonus edition of Future Nostalgia, as the album's fifth single. The remix impacted contemporary hit radio formats in the United States on 6 October 2020, serving as the album's third single in the country. The remix has the same production used in the original, with DaBaby adding a pop rap verse and intro.

"Levitating" reached number five on the UK Singles Chart and number two on the US Billboard Hot 100, becoming Lipa's seventh top-five single in the UK and second in the US. Despite not reaching number one in the United States, "Levitating" was named the number-one song of 2021, becoming the fourth single to accomplish this feat and the first single to do so since Lifehouse's "Hanging by a Moment" in 2001. It also ranks in the top 40 of its All-Time list. This song is also the longest-charting song by a female artist on the Billboard Hot 100 chart, spending a total of 77 weeks on the chart and placing it 5th overall. It also reached number two on the Billboard Global 200 chart and became #1 on the 2021 year-end chart. The song was awarded a Platinum certification in the United Kingdom by the British Phonographic Industry (BPI).

"Levitating" was promoted with the release of two music videos, one for each of its respective remixes. The Will Hooper-directed music video for the Blessed Madonna's remix was filmed in London and Atlanta and has a theme of "love conquers all". It sees many people under the influence of a mysterious planet and being obsessed with a maze-like symbol. The DaBaby remix received a music video that was directed by Warren Fu and created in partnership with social media platform TikTok. The video is centred around Lipa and DaBaby dancing in an art deco-styled elevator, with many TikTok users in the cast. Lipa promoted the single with live performances on The Graham Norton Show, at the American Music Awards of 2020, and on Saturday Night Live.

Background

After figuring out the title of her second studio album, Future Nostalgia, Dua Lipa began working backwards, figuring out the sound she desired. Shortly after, "Levitating" was written, which is the first track recorded that appears on the album's final track listing. The song was written by Lipa with her longtime collaborators Clarence Coffee Jr. of The Monsters & Strangerz, Sarah Hudson and Stephen Kozmeniuk, the latter of which also handled the production. Before going into the studio, Kozmeniuk spent a few weeks coming up with ideas to play in the studio, eventually thinking it would be cool to create a "slinky disco track." Lipa sent him some notes and stuff that she was inspired by, which became the idea of blending old with new. Kozmeniuk thought the best way to create this idea was to use old instruments, one of which was a Roland VP-330 synthesizer, which he had been looking for, for seven to eight years. After shipping the synthesizer from Tokyo to Toronto, he immediately plugged it in and began playing. The first thing he played, which he described as a "synthetic choir sound", later turned into the synth line from the song. He looped the sound and began building a song around it, including creating an analog string sound, also using the Roland VP-330.

"Levitating" was written and recorded in a one-day studio session at Sarm West Studios in Notting Hill, London between the four writers on 28 August 2018. They started the session by Hudson doing a Tarot card reading in order for the writers to open up about what was happening in their lives. Lipa recalled it "changing the energy in the room." Kozmeniuk then began playing some tracks he had created with Lipa in mind. "Levitating" was one of the first tracks he played, which the collaborators all agreed that it would be the one to write onto. Lipa took out the voice memos app on her phone and began leading the song by singing a melody, making it up on the way with Coffee later elevating it. They had the visuals of being in an Austin Powers movie, with Mike Myers doing a random dance to the song, which helped give them a mood while writing the lyrics. The session ended up with the collaborators ordering doughnuts and 'levitating' from the sugar rush. They immediately began writing after that, with a good feeling going into it. They decided to include the "sugarboo" lyric as an ode to their friendship as it was something they called one another as a joke. Lipa also decided to add a rap in order to get her British side across, because she often gets mistaken from where she is actually from.

Lipa began by recording the lead vocals, and later some backing vocals and vocals with all the collaborators. They would create different personas with different vocals every time they recorded them. Lipa recalled that she and her co-writers were dancing all through making the song, even if they were experiencing writer's block or working on the production. After finishing the song, Lipa enlisted the help of Stuart Price for some additional production. He brought more "bounce" to the song and helped with the bass groove. He also incorporated a high drone synth as a disco trope, and a string part in the pre-chorus. Koz later also enlisted the help of Bosko Electrospit Kante to play a talk box. "Levitating" helped dictate what the rest of Future Nostalgia would sound like and where Lipa thought everything made sense, where she had both the "future" and "nostalgia" elements. She called it the "starting point" of the album.

Music and lyrics

"Levitating" is an electro-disco, nu-disco and pop-funk song, with dance-pop, power pop and space rock elements. The song incorporates music styles from the 1970s, 1980s, and 1990s pop and R&B. Constructed in verse–chorus form, the song runs for 3 minutes and 23 seconds and is composed in  time and the key of B minor, with a tempo of 103 beats per minute and a chord progression of Bm7—Fm7—Em7. It is built around a wonky synth hook, with 1990s choruses and several campy disco tropes. The rest of the production consists of funky synth disco beats, a "squelchy" bass, "rubbery" basslines, syncopated handclaps, nu-disco rhythms, "wonky" and "bizarre" synths, an EDM groove, funky guitars, talk box vocals, a "hypnotic" synth line and disco strings. The bass, guitars, and talk box give off a disco-funk feeling. Following the first chorus, the instruments are stripped back. On his remix, DaBaby adds a new pop rap verse and intro, over the original's production, with him serving as an additional writer on the track.

Lipa's vocals range from F3 to B4. The middle eight includes a Blondie-influenced rap, where Lipa exerts her British accent, before she performs an a cappella ahead of the final chorus. "Levitating" has many outer space references, using an exaggerated metaphor of love as a spaceship to transmit radiant euphoria and happiness. Lyrically, the song sees Lipa exposing her feelings for a significant other and singing about moments with them in which she is her best self. For NME, Rhian Daly stated she sings about "a love 'written in the stars'", while 411Manias David Hayter, labelled it an "intergalactic ode to orgasms". The song received many comparisons to the works of Chic, Daft Punk, Debbie Harry, the Jackson 5 ("Blame It on the Boogie", 1978), Kylie Minogue, Moloko, Kate Nash, Outkast ("Rosa Parks", 1998), Katy Perry, the Spice Girls, Tinie Tempah ("Pass Out", 2010), the Weeknd (Starboy, 2016), and Super Mario 64 (1996) sound effects.

Release and promotion
"Levitating" was released on 27 March 2020 as the fifth track on Lipa's second studio album, Future Nostalgia. In August 2020, Lipa confirmed that the song would serve as the album's fifth official single. It was promoted to Italian and British contemporary hit radio formats on 13 August and 23 September 2020, as a promotional single. On 25 September 2020, DaBaby confirmed in an interview with Capital FM that he had a collaboration with Lipa coming out soon. Later that day, Lipa announced that a remix of "Levitating" featuring DaBaby would be released a week later. The remix's cover art was shot by Joseph Ford. It premiered on 1 October 2020, being released for digital download and streaming. The remix was later added to the three editions of Future Nostalgia: the bonus edition which was released alongside the song, the digital edition released on 29 October 2020, and the 20 November 2020-released French CD edition.

The remix was serviced to contemporary hit radio formats in the United States on 6 October 2020, serving as the album's third single in the country. It was also serviced to contemporary hit radio formats in Italy and the United Kingdom on 2 October and 9 October 2020, respectively. The original was serviced to adult contemporary radio formats in the United Kingdom on 17 October 2020. The remix was also scheduled to be serviced to adult contemporary radio formats in the US on 19 October 2020, but was ultimately replaced with the original. Due to its music video partnership with TikTok, the app launched a worldwide advertising campaign with promotion on several digital and social media channels, as well as New York City's Times Square and prominent sites in cities across Europe. The app also launched the #Levitating challenge, where Lipa invited fans to use TikTok's slow-motion feature to show off their levitating skills. The song was promoted with an Instagram filter on the app. Lipa and Koz did an interview about the creation of the song on music podcast Song Exploders 194th episode, released on 7 October 2020. It was also included in Morrisons' 2020 Christmas TV Ad. The song was used during the 46th People's Choice Awards on 15 November 2020. The song was included in a promotional video for the 2020–21 NBA season made by NBA on TNT. Joe Biden and Kamala Harris used it in a playlist supporting their inauguration.

A remix of the track by KUU was released on 20 November 2020. It is a four on the floor-styled song with a simple and hypnotic sound design that makes use of tropical synths, Balearic beats, a rolling bassline, and funky piano chords, all layered with Lipa's vocals.

A remix of the track by Amaal Mallik featuring guest vocals in Hindi by Prakriti Kakar and Sukriti Kakar was released on 26 March 2021.

Over the 2020–21 Premier League season, a video clip of Manchester City manager Pep Guardiola dancing, with part of the track overlaid on it, surfaced on Twitter. The clip was later posted by Manchester City's official Twitter account on 4 February 2021 and again on 7 February 2021 following Manchester City's 4–1 victory over Liverpool, which was their first victory at Anfield in 18 years.

Critical reception

In September 2020, Callie Ahlgrim of Business Insider viewed "Levitating" as Future Nostalgias "most enchanting track" and one of Lipa's "best ever" songs. She went on to praise it for getting better with every listen and her use of pet names, as well as calling the song "sugary," "upbeat," and "unabashed." Bailey Slater of Wonderland called it a "roller disco bop" and thought that it would go viral on TikTok. Gabbie Nirenburg of No Ripcord praised the track's blend of disco and futuristic while also calling the lyrics "clever." In his review for God Is in the TV, Jonathan Wright commended the song for being a "classy piece of brilliantly-timed disco escapism." The Line of Best Fits Chris Taylor viewed it as "peak disco-revivalism" and thought it was meant for a roller disco.

In The Guardian, Laura Snapes stated that "Levitating" "blooms like a row of tropical flowers." For Crack Magazine, Michael Cragg noted its French bloghouse hallmarks, previously explored on "Don't Start Now". DIYs Elly Watson labelled the song "dancefloor-ready," while Mike Nied of Idolator named it multiple titles, including a "starry-eyed love song," a "straight up sugar rush," an "intergalactic adventure," and "breezy and feel-good." For Billboard, Bianca Gracie labelled it a "summery jam" and recommended playing it on a Miami road trip. Nick Smith of musicOMH stated that the song comes off as "a funky caffeine and sugar overdose." In Slant Magazine, Sal Cinquemani labelled it a "feel-good earworm." For Nylon, Shaad D'Souza criticized the song for its lack of longevity.

For Vinyl Chapters, Jamie Parmenter praised Lipa's rap in the middle eight, writing one has the "pleasure of hearing the singer's English accent" and it "shows the confidence she has in her own talent." In The Daily Telegraph, Neil McCormick also complimented Lipa's accent in that rap, and praised the "transatlantic-friendly" sound of "Levitating". Conrad Duncan of Under the Radar criticised the rap, calling it a "bafflingly unnecessary misfire," while also noting its aim for Kurtis Blow. The Arts Desks Joe Muggs also criticised the rap, writing it "falls short." Vultures Craig Jenkins praised Lipa's vocal delivery for merging elements of anxiety and sexual tension, while also naming the lyrics "flurries of pickup lines." For The Young Folks, Ryan Feyre called the song a high point on Future Nostalgia and wrote that it is "filled with raw adrenaline."

Critics also praised DaBaby parts in his respective remix. Heran Mamo of Billboard noted DaBaby asserting attitude and stated he brings the song to "new heights." For Idolator, Mike Wass stated the remix "works well enough" with the original's production, and viewed DaBaby's verse as "surprisingly sweet." Papers Shaad D'Souza thought that the remix presented DaBaby a chance to "shake up his flow", while also labelling it "inspired." Revolt's Regina Cho also commented on DaBaby's flow, stating it matches the song's "groovy bounce." Of HotNewHipHop, Alexander Cole praised DaBaby for fitting perfectly with the track's "undeniable groove," while also stating he is a "nice addition" to the song. In Consequence of Sound, Ben Kaye challenged that it is not a remix due to its use of the original's production.

Commercial performance
Following the release of Future Nostalgia, "Levitating" found success as an album track throughout Europe, debuting at number 97 in Greece, 29 in Hungary, 41 in Lithuania, 83 in Portugal, 62 in Slovakia, and 71 in Spain. In the United Kingdom, the song was the most streamed album track on video services. It debuted at number 51 on the UK Official Audio Streaming Chart dated 3 April 2020. Following the release of the Blessed Madonna's remix, the original version debuted at number 39 on the UK Singles Chart dated 21 August 2020. It lasted five weeks on the chart, before re-entering at number 30 on the chart dated 9 October 2020, following the release of the DaBaby remix. The song peaked at number five on the chart, becoming Lipa's tenth UK Top 10 single. In November 2020, the song reached the summit of the UK Radio Airplay Chart. In January 2021, it was awarded a Platinum certification from the British Phonographic Industry (BPI) for track-equivalent sales of 600,000 units. It has also reached number four and 13 respectively on the Irish Singles Chart and Scottish Singles Chart respectively.

"Levitating" reached the summit of the chart in Bulgaria. On Australia's ARIA Singles Chart dated 26 October 2020, the original began being credited as the Blessed Madonna's remix was credited before then, and peaked at number four. In New Zealand, the original version debuted at number six on the NZ Hot Singles Chart dated 6 April 2020, and the 12 October 2020 chart saw DaBaby's remix debuting at number 14. On the NZ Top 40 Singles Chart dated 19 October 2020, the original version debuted at number 36, and the DaBaby Remix was later credited, reaching a peak of number five. The remix was awarded a quadruple platinum certification in the country by Recorded Music NZ for track-equivalent sales of 120,000 units.

DaBaby's remix of "Levitating" debuted at number 51 on the Billboard Global 200 chart dated 17 October 2020, and has peaked at number 2 on the chart. It has reached number one on the Canadian Hot 100, becoming Lipa's first and DaBaby's second number-one single in Canada. It topped the chart for three nonconsecutive weeks. "Levitating" became Lipa's biggest US chart hit. It debuted at number 73 on the Billboard Hot 100 chart dated 17 October 2020. On the chart dated 9 January 2021, it reached the chart's tenth position, becoming Lipa's third top 10 single following "Don't Start Now" and "New Rules" (2017). It peaked at number 2 on the chart (behind Silk Sonic's "Leave the Door Open"), tying "Don't Start Now" as Lipa's highest-charting US song, and it is Lipa's longest-running top-10 hit. On the issue dated 4 September 2021, in its 34th week in the top 10, "Levitating" surpassed “Girls Like You” by Maroon 5 featuring Cardi B to become the longest-running top 10 single by a female artist. It has since become the second song to spend a total of 40 weeks in the top ten, as of the week ending 30 October 2021, after "Blinding Lights" by The Weeknd. On the issue dated 19 March 2022, in its 70th week on the chart, "Levitating" surpassed "How Do I Live" by LeAnn Rimes as the longest-charting hit on the Hot 100 by a female artist. The DaBaby remix of "Levitating" topped both the US Mainstream Top 40 chart, which monitors pop radio stations, and the US Adult Top 40, which monitors hot adult contemporary radio formats. It also reached number one on the Radio Songs chart after a 37-week climb, the longest climb to the top spot in the chart's 30-year history, surpassing the 35-week climb set by "I Hope" by Gabby Barrett in October 2020. In December 2021, the solo version of "Levitating" was named the best-performing single of the year on the Hot 100, becoming only the fourth single to achieve this without topping the weekly chart (after "Wooly Bully" by Sam the Sham and the Pharaohs in 1965, "Breathe" by Faith Hill in 2000, and "Hanging by a Moment" by Lifehouse in 2001) and the first single by a female solo artist to top the year-end chart since 2011.

Music video

Background and release
From 25 August 2020 to 31 August 2020, Lipa held a contest on social media platform TikTok for fans to create visualisers for "Levitating", including dance, animation, and makeup, for a chance to be featured in the video, later revealed to be the video for the remix featuring DaBaby. The challenge garnered 300,000,000 views and 150,000 video submissions, of which 16 creators were invited to be a part of the video. Three creators, Andrew Wilson, Ramana Borba, and Rikki Sandhu, helped as part of the crew. They animated Lipa's cosmic dance floor, helped with some of the dance routines, and designed the cosmic makeup on Lipa's dancers, respectively. For the video, Lipa had a mood board consisting of Austin Powers, 1960s futurism and surrealism, Studio 54 and disco, thinking that "Levitating" was the perfect song to encapsulate these ideas.

The music video was directed by American director Warren Fu, and took over 16 and a half hours to shoot, with stylist Lorenzo Posocco being on Zoom for over 17 hours during it. While filming, Lipa quickly decided that she did not like her look moments before going on camera, and within five minutes hairstylist Chris Appleton flipped her wig and gave her a whole new look. TikTok users Dexter Mayfield and Olivia Wong prepared for being on camera by vibing off everyone's energy and staying calm, respectively. DaBaby was originally supposed to be dressed as an astronaut for his shots, but ultimately did not due to the video's "flow", so he could just party. The visual premiered on YouTube at 13:00 BST (12:00 UTC) on 2 October 2020. It was proceeded by the release of two teasers on TikTok, in which Lipa invites users to "The Levitating Experience" that takes one to an "intergalactic dance floor;" she also warns viewers not to mess with the system and informs them about how to get there, among other items.

An alternate animated music video was released on September 13, 2021, using the original version of the song without DaBaby. The music video was produced by Japanese animation group NOSTALOOK, in retro 1980s-1990s Japanese anime style, similar to Sailor Moon and Creamy Mami.

Synopsis

The music video opens with Lipa lying on the hood of a Plymouth Barracuda, watching the stars in the night sky. She sports blonde hair and glittering eye makeup, and wears a Misbhv sheer top, cargo trousers, and Puma trainers as well as a "sugarboo" necklace which Hudson and Coffee gave her for her birthday. A portal of white light then appears out of nowhere, and Lipa's clothes change into a custom Atelier Versace mini dress made out of Swarovski crystal mesh; she worked closely with the Versace to create a "disco dream" dress. Lipa's "sugarboo" necklace then levitates off her neck, and she goes up materializing stairs into the portal. The portal closes and shoots up into the night sky, transporting Lipa to a futuristic, art deco, disco and The Great Gatsby-themed elevator, which has gold trimming and the TikTok logo as its arrow indicating what floor they are on. She dances in the elevator, accompanied by two girls dressed as bellhops.

Shortly after, the elevator reads "Approaching KRK-91", a reference to DaBaby's real name, Kirk, and his birth year, 1991. One of the bellhop girls then goes to the door, and swipes up on a screen next to it to an outline of DaBaby; she presses a button under it. The door opens and DaBaby enters the elevator, wearing a knitted multicolour monogram flower crewneck outfit from Louis Vuitton's FW20 collection, alongside iced jewels and a chain that says "Kirk". DaBaby raps to the camera as Lipa casually dances behind him, where she blows a kiss and puts her arm around DaBaby. The elevator then reaches "Roller World", where girls on roller skates enter the elevator, in 1970s-inspired attire. They all dance together with large moves, and the elevator shines cherry red lights ever so often. The elevator reaches its final stop, and one of the bellhop girls swipes the screen to release. One of the passengers is launched into space before the dancers begin to appear dancing on a Milky Way-like illuminated circular belt. Lipa is seen dancing on a platform in the middle of the belt, sporting bangs, and wearing a Mugler dress with elbow-length gloves from Casey Cadwallader's autumn/winter 2020 show.

Reception
The staff of DIY labelled the "Levitating" music video "glitzy and glam", and noted its Studio 54 aesthetic. For the Gay Times, Sam Damshenas praised Lipa's "intergalactic disco diva" role. Katrina Rees of CelebMix named the video "futuristic," while Idolators Mike Wass pointed out its blockbuster production. In Vogue, Susan Devaney compared Lipa's custom Versace dress to that of previous outfits worn by Paris Hilton and Kendall Jenner. The magazine later placed the video among the "Most-Stylish Music Videos of 2020" list. Writing for Billboard, Heran Mamo called the video "luxe," while Hypebeasts Clara Malley viewed it as "a 'Great Gatsby'-meets-disco twist." In Rolling Stone, Claire Shaffer noted the visual's Milky Way themes and imagery.

On April 5, 2022, the music video garnered 500 million views on YouTube.

Controversies

DaBaby controversy
On 25 July 2021, DaBaby performed at Rolling Loud, in which he made controversial comments, saying, "If you didn't show up today with HIV, AIDS, or any of them deadly sexually transmitted diseases that'll make you die in two to three weeks, then put your cellphone lighter up." His remarks drew condemnation, and Kirk responded to the allegations with "What me and my fans do at the live show, it don't concern you niggas on the internet, or you bitter bitches on the internet." This caused Lipa's fans to ask that DaBaby be removed from the remix of "Levitating". On 27 July 2021, Lipa took to her Instagram story to denounce DaBaby's remarks. Other celebrities such as Elton John would also express their condemnations towards DaBaby.

The controversy later prompted the removal of the "Levitating" remix across multiple radio stations and Apple Music playlists in various countries. It was simultaneously replaced with the original solo version of the song, which was initially released in March 2020 as part of the album. Billboard later reported that while US radio audience impressions for all versions of the song combined was only down 1% for the tracking week of 23 to 29 July 2021, the percentage of the song's radio plays being the DaBaby remix declined following his remarks (dropping from 71% of all radio plays on 25 July to 59% on 29 July (the last day of the tracking week)). On the week ending 28 August 2021, DaBaby's credit was removed on the Billboard Hot 100 as the chart's rules state that the version of the song that contributes to the greatest share of a song's performance on the chart is the one that is credited on the chart, indicating that the original solo version of the song had overtaken the DaBaby remix to have the greatest share of the song's overall performance that week.

Copyright lawsuits
On 1 March 2022, reggae band Artikal Sound System filed a suit against Lipa and her label Warner Records alleging copyright infringement, asserting similarities between "Levitating" and their 2017 song "Live Your Life" (also alleging the producers have known the song before "Levitating" was in production). Less than a week later, a second suit by songwriters L. Russell Brown and Sandy Linzer claimed that "Levitating" infringed on their 1979 disco song "Wiggle and Giggle All Night".

The Blessed Madonna remix

Background and release
Following the release of Future Nostalgia, Lipa enlisted the help of the Blessed Madonna to create a remix album that would later become Club Future Nostalgia. The Blessed Madonna remixed two tracks on the record, "Levitating" and the previously-unreleased "Love Is Religion". For "Levitating", which had multiple versions, both Lipa and the Blessed Madonna had the vision of a "fun" club remix. The Blessed Madonna originally created it as if Lipa was the only person singing on it. After finishing the remix, Lipa thought that Madonna and Missy Elliott would sound amazing on it, so she reached out to both of them via email, with both responding saying they would be up for it. Madonna recorded her vocals in a separate studio, with her engineer Mike Dean sending them to the Blessed Madonna. Madonna did several variations, including breaking out into her 1983 single "Lucky Star" for a second. Elliott then sent her verse, which included an air horn. The Blessed Madonna then "frankensteined" the three parts together, before Madonna requested that Dean mix down the song. Dean ended up handing both the mastering and mix down. Both Madonna and Elliott are added as songwriters, while the Blessed Madonna is credited as the remixer and an additional producer.

On 30 June 2020, Lipa's manager Ben Mawson revealed in an interview with Music Week that Lipa's team was attempting to organise a collaboration between her and Madonna. Future Nostalgia was heavily influenced by Madonna's Confessions on a Dance Floor, both of which feature songs co-produced by Stuart Price, including "Levitating". On 27 July 2020, Lipa announced the single release of a remix of "Levitating" by the Blessed Madonna featuring Madonna and Missy Elliott. The song was later confirmed to be the lead single of Club Future Nostalgia. The song premiered at 09:00 PT (16:00 UTC) on 13 August 2020, being released for digital download and streaming. The remix was serviced to contemporary hit radio formats in Italy the same day, and was also released on 12-inch vinyl on 21 August 2020 by We Still Believe, an independent label owned by the Blessed Madonna.

Composition

The Blessed Madonna's remix of "Levitating" is an EDM, electro-disco, electro house, future bass and techno track. It runs for 4 minutes and 10 seconds, and has a throwback disco and trance vibe. It increases the tempo of the original, with Lipa, Madonna and Elliott each contributing a verse. Lipa and Madonna harmonise with one and other, while trading verses and Elliott half-sings and half-raps. The remix has a dance-orientated house production, consisting of Daft Punk vocoder backing vocals, a pounding bass, nostalgic and futuristic synths, and house beats.

Reception

The Blessed Madonna's remix of "Levitating" was met with mixed reviews from music critics. In Rolling Stone, Brittany Spanos viewed the Blessed Madonna "Levitating" remix as "tongue-twistingly," a "fast-paced romp," and "clubbier" than the original, while also labelling Elliott's verse "flirty" and "freaky." The staff of Rap-Up called it a "pulsing dance-floor bop," while Maia Kedem of Radio.com viewed Elliott's verse as "tastefully naughty." Billboards Katie Bain noted the remix for being "darkly funky" and stated it brings the original to "new heights" while Heran Mamo of the same magazine stated it shows Lipa's "star power." Nick Romano of Entertainment Weekly said the remix is "what you need to turn any isolated apartment into the hottest club."

For Slant Magazine, Alexa Camp praised Elliott's "versatility," and stated the Blessed Madonna's "Levitating" remix is worthy of Giorgio Moroder or Cerrone, while Madonna's vocal delivery to Jody Watley. Joe Price of Complex praised Elliott and Madonna's vocals complimenting Lipa's, and noted its further cementation of Lipa's crossover appeal. In a negative review from Clash, Robin Murray stated it has a "truncated nature" feeling that does not "click into place," while also commenting that it "doesn't get the space to breathe properly." AllMusic's Neil Z. Yeung agreed, writing it fails to hit "the highs that the crew targeted." For The Line of Best Fit, Udit Mahalingam thought that it failed to live up to the original. Pitchforks Owen Myers viewed the Elliott and Madonna features as deflating the remix. In The Guardian, Michael Cragg rated the remix a 6 out of 10, and stated it is "another example of 2020's endless disappointments."

In Canada, the Blessed Madonna's remix reached number 16 on the Canadian Digital Song Sales, In the United States, the Blessed Madonna's remix debuted and peaked at number 10 on the Bubbling Under Hot 100 singles chart, while also reaching number 6 on the Hot Dance/Electronic Songs chart, lasting one and seven weeks on each chart respectively. The Blessed Madonna's remix debuted at number nine on the NZ Hot Singles chart dated 22 August 2020, It also reached number 47 in Italy and number 10 on the Euro Digital Song Sales chart. Following the release of the DaBaby remix, the Blessed Madonna's remix debuted at number 35 on Australia's ARIA Singles Chart dated 19 October 2020.

Music video

Background and reception

The music video for the Blessed Madonna's remix of "Levitating" was directed by Will Hooper and produced by production company Blink, led by producer Corin Taylor and executive producer Laura Northover. Due to lockdown restrictions imposed by the COVID-19 pandemic, the video concept was developed virtually, with many video calls with Lipa and her management team TAP. The crew ran into difficulties during the production due to several film industry services being closed or running at a reduced service. They made sure to run a safe set and follow the government's guidance toward the virus. The video includes appearances from Lipa, Elliott, and Lipa's then-boyfriend, Anwar Hadid, with both the Blessed Madonna and Madonna being absent. It draws inspiration from extraterrestrial life and science fiction. Rina Yang serves as the video's director of photography, and she creates a contemporary and inspired vision, somewhere in between fashion editorial and home video, with many blue and red hues.

The music video was filmed in June 2020 in London over the course of 4 days, while Elliott filmed her parts with her respective team in Atlanta, in conjunction with Lipa's UK team. It was one of the first large productions to shoot to APA guidelines after the lockdown restrictions. Due to social distancing protocols associated with the COVID-19 pandemic, the production team decided to cast real couples, which led to Hadid's casting. The video's filming, which song was then unknown, was reported on 18 June 2020, along with Hadid's casting. The visual premiered at 05:00 PT (12:00 UTC) on 14 August 2020. Rania Aniftos of Billboard labelled the Blessed Madonna's "Levitating" remix video "colourful" and "dreamy." For Consequence of Sound, Lake Schatz noted its "candy-coated, Miami glaze" lenses and praised its "mythical and celestial imagery." He concluded by stating the video is "snazzy" and like "a four-minute Ring Pop." Radio.com's Maia Kedem viewed the video as a mix of Sailor Moon, Euphoria, and Twilight. In her review for Vogue, Janelle Okwodu complimented its "trippy visuals, bright colors" and wardrobe that visualise Future Nostalgias "retro rave theme."

Synopsis
The music video has a theme of "love conquers all," and consists of many scenes synthesising to depict many romantic moments, with each scene being woven in and out of the storyline. The storyline features numerous people getting obsessed with a maze-like symbol while under the influence of a mysterious glowing planet. Throughout the video, psychedelic shots of ghostly fields and gem-studded cars are shown. The video begins with a montage of some of the video's events before Lipa is seen looking at the planet out of a window from an apartment. Her hair is dyed hot pink and she wears Martine Rose logo print PJ pants and an e-girl python bodysuit. She begins to dance around the apartment where a vinyl is playing and is filled with analog recorders and buzzing televisions.

The next scene sees a blonde woman in a bedroom looking at herself in a mirror and holding a small item with the maze-like symbol that she hides under her pillow but later breaks it in half. She then looks through a telescope at a brunette girl reading a book. The brunette girl looks straight at the telescope, slightly scaring the blonde girl before the brunette eats the same item that the blonde girl put under her pillow. In the following scene, a bunch of people hang out in a skating park, drawing the maze-like symbol with chalk and skating, as well as a couple kissing. Next, two people are seen walking under a highway-like structure, which has graffiti of the maze-like symbol, with one holding a briefcase. They eventually get to a spot where they open a green-like crystal. Following, a man is seen in the middle of a field, spray-painting the symbol on a white sheet. Another man is seen driving his car to a point near the highway-like structure. He pulls a net out of his car and looks up into the sky. This scene ends with a moon appearing in his car before a woman takes its place.

Towards the end, Elliott makes her appearance for her verse. She wears a Versace palm print, with a lime green jacket and baseball cap alongside outsized hoop earrings and lengthy box braids. A woman in a shimmery disco ball dress is seen dancing in a field, appearing there from a shooting star. Lipa and Hadid are then seen lying in a field of flowers and driving a car into the planet, in which the two kiss. Lipa wears a white-striped navy sailor-inspired Miu Miu knit bodysuit with a Peter Pan collar, while Hadid sports a low-key t-shirt and jeans. The visual ends with Lipa and Hadid starring off at the planet.

Accolades
"Levitating" appeared on the 2020 year-end lists by numerous publications, including being placed as the best song of the year by Cosmopolitan and the Herald Sun. In Billboard, the song placed on their "30 Best Pop Songs of 2020" list. The Guardian writers Laura Snapes, Lanre Bakare, and Hannah J Davies all included the song among their favourite songs of 2020. Steven Pearl of Rolling Stone ranked the DaBaby remix at number six on his year-end list Atwood Magazines Anthony Kozlowski ranked the original version as 2020's second best song, while Official Charts Company operations executive Cat Smyth named it her favourite song of 2020. Former American president Barack Obama included the DaBaby Remix on his "Favorite Songs of 2020" list. Time Out ranked the solo version of "Levitating" as the thirty-fifth best song of all time.

Awards and nominations

Year-end lists

Live performances
Lipa performed "Levitating" for the first time on The Graham Norton Show on 20 November 2020. Two days later she performed it at the American Music Awards of 2020. The ceremony took place at the Microsoft Theater in Los Angeles, however Lipa's performance was filmed at London's Royal Albert Hall in a custom built set. At the end of the performance, she levitated towards the sky with the help of wires through a pulley system, which gained praise from Olivia Horn of The New York Times and Vultures Justin Curto, who both viewed the performance as one of the ceremony's best moments. Horn also praised Lipa's dancing abilities. For Radio.com, Marty Rosenbaum ranked it as the night's eighth best moment and also praised the levitating bit.

Lipa performed "Levitating" as the second track on the setlist for her Studio 2054 live stream concert on 27 November 2020. She performed it during her NPR Tiny Desk Concert, released 4 December 2020. The following day, Lipa performed it as a medley with her single "Physical" (2020) at both the LOS40 Music Awards 2020 and the 2020 NRJ Music Awards; she also performed "Fever" (2020) with Angèle at the latter ceremony. On 10 December 2020, Lipa performed an acoustic set at the 2020 iHeartRadio Jingle Ball which included "Levitating" as well as "Don't Start Now" and a cover of "Happy Xmas (War Is Over)", the latter of which was a virtual performance with a few of her fans for Capital One's Holiday Jam. During her 19 December 2020 Saturday Night Live appearance, she performed "Levitating", "Don't Start Now", and acted in a World War II-themed skit. Lipa performed the song as part of her 22 December 2020 Pandora livestream concert. On New Year's Eve 2020, she performed it during YouTube's Hello 2021 virtual countdown special for the Indian, British and American shows.

On 14 March 2021, Lipa performed the remixed version with DaBaby for the first time at the 63rd Annual Grammy Awards, alongside a performance of "Don't Start Now".

Track listings

Digital download / streaming – DaBaby Remix
 "Levitating" (featuring DaBaby)3:23

Digital download / streaming – KUU Remix
 "Levitating" (KUU Remix) [featuring DaBaby]4:10

Digital EP – Version 1
 "Levitating" (featuring DaBaby)3:23
 "Levitating"3:23
 "Levitating (The Blessed Madonna Remix)" (featuring Madonna and Missy Elliott)4:10
 "Levitating" (KUU Remix) [featuring DaBaby]4:10

Digital download / streaming – Don Diablo Remix
 "Levitating" (Don Diablo Remix) [featuring DaBaby]3:28

Digital download / streaming – Don Diablo Extended Remix
 "Levitating" (Don Diablo Extended Remix) [featuring DaBaby]4:28

Digital EP – Version 2
 "Levitating" (featuring DaBaby)3:23
 "Levitating"3:23
 "Levitating" (The Blessed Madonna Remix) [featuring Madonna and Missy Elliott]4:10
 "Levitating" (KUU Remix) [featuring DaBaby]4:10
 "Levitating" (Don Diablo Remix) [featuring DaBaby]3:28

Digital download / streaming – Amaal Mallik Remix
 "Levitating" (Amaal Mallik Remix) [featuring Sukriti Kakar and Prakriti Kakar]2:36

Credits and personnel
Credits adapted from the liner notes of Future Nostalgia: The Moonlight Edition.

Recording and management
 Vocals recorded at Sarm Studios (London, United Kingdom)
 Recorded at the Bunker at 13, Sarm Music Village (London, United Kingdom) and Modulator Music (Toronto, Canada)
 Mixed at Henson Studios (Hollywood, California)
 Mastered at Sterling Sound (Edgewater, New Jersey)

Personnel

 Dua Lipa vocals
 DaBaby featured vocals
 Stephen Kozmeniuk production, vocal production, bass, drums, guitar, synthesizer
 Stuart Price production, bass, drum programming, keyboards
 Clarence Coffee Jr. backing vocals
 Sarah Hudson backing vocals
 Paul Phamous backing vocals
 Todd Clark backing vocals
 Russell Graham keyboards
 Bosko "Electrospit" Kante talkbox
 Homer Steinweiss drums
 Lorna Blackwood additional vocal recording, programming
 Matt Snell engineering
 Phil Hotz assistant engineering
 Cameron Gower Poole vocal engineering
 Josh Gudwin mixing
 Elijah Marrett-Hitch assistant mixing
 Heidi Wang assistant mixing
 Chris Gehringer mastering
 Will Quinnell assistant mastering

Charts

Weekly charts

Year-end charts

All-time charts

Certifications

Release history

See also

 List of top 10 singles for 2020 in Australia
 List of top 10 singles for 2021 in Australia
 List of top 10 singles in 2020 (Ireland)
 List of UK top-ten singles in 2020
 List of UK top-ten singles in 2021
 List of Billboard Hot 100 top-ten singles in 2021
 List of Canadian Hot 100 number-one singles of 2021
 List of Billboard Adult Contemporary number ones of 2021

References

Notes

Citations

External links
 
 

2018 songs
2020 singles
Dua Lipa songs
Canadian Hot 100 number-one singles
DaBaby songs
Funk songs
Nu-disco songs
Song recordings produced by Stuart Price
Songs written by Clarence Coffee Jr.
Songs written by DaBaby
Songs written by Dua Lipa
Songs written by Sarah Hudson (singer)
Songs written by Stephen Kozmeniuk
Warner Records singles
Music videos directed by Warren Fu
Songs involved in plagiarism controversies